Choi Soo-yeon (Hangul: 최수연, born 23 November 1990) is a South Korean right-handed sabre fencer, 2022 team Asian champion, 2022 individual Asian champion, and 2021 team Olympic bronze medalist.

Medal Record

Olympic Games

World Championship

Asian Championship

Grand Prix

References

External links

1990 births
Living people
South Korean sabre fencers
South Korean female fencers
Fencers at the 2018 Asian Games
Asian Games gold medalists for South Korea
Asian Games medalists in fencing
Medalists at the 2018 Asian Games
Fencers at the 2020 Summer Olympics
Olympic fencers of South Korea
Medalists at the 2020 Summer Olympics
Olympic medalists in fencing
Olympic bronze medalists for South Korea
Sportspeople from North Jeolla Province
21st-century South Korean women